Chico Olympio (died 1886) was an Afro-Brazilian trader who helped expand Lomé, the future capital of Togoland and Togo.  Son of Francisco Olympio Sylvio, Chico Olympio worked with his brothers Octaviano and Cesar at a branch office of the British trading firm A. and F. Swanzy.  In 1882, Chico and Octaviano were commissioned to open a new branch office in the growing trading center of Bey Beach on the Gulf of Guinea.  The office was immediately successful, allowing the founding of the Olympio family dynasty in the city.  However, Chico died in 1886.

External links
History of the Olympio family

1886 deaths
Brazilian emigrants to Togo
Year of birth missing